The Descendants is a 2011 American comedy-drama film directed by Alexander Payne. The screenplay by Payne, Nat Faxon, and Jim Rash is based on the 2007 novel of the same name by Kaui Hart Hemmings. The film stars George Clooney in the main role, Shailene Woodley, Amara Miller in her film debut, Beau Bridges, Judy Greer, Matthew Lillard, and Robert Forster, and was released by Fox Searchlight Pictures in the United States on November 18, 2011, after premiering at the 2011 Toronto International Film Festival on September 10, 2011.

Tracing the journey of attorney and land baron Matt King, who struggles with unexpected occurrences in his monotonous life, The Descendants was a critical and financial success, grossing $177 million against a $20 million budget and receiving acclaim for the performances of Clooney and Woodley, Payne's direction and writing, and Kevin Tent's editing. The film was nominated for five Oscars at the 84th Academy Awards, including Best Picture, Best Director for Payne, and Best Actor for Clooney, winning one for Best Adapted Screenplay. The film also won two Golden Globe Awards; Best Picture – Drama and Best Actor – Drama for Clooney.

Plot
The land has great monetary value, but is also a family legacy. While Matt (like his father before) has ably managed his own finances, most of his cousins have squandered their inheritances. With the trust expiring in seven years due to the rule against perpetuities, the King clan is pressuring Matt to sell the land for hundreds of millions of dollars. Amidst these discussions, a boating accident has rendered Matt's wife, Elizabeth, comatose. With Elizabeth hospitalized, Matt is forced to cope with his two troubled daughters, 10-year-old Scottie, who seeks attention by bullying other children, and 17-year-old Alex with a history of substance abuse who is away at a private boarding school on the Big Island. Doctors determine that Elizabeth's coma is irreversible and her living will directs all life support to be discontinued. When Matt tells Alex, she reveals she learned Elizabeth was having an affair during her last visit, causing a major rift between mother and daughter.

Two close family friends, Kai and Mark Mitchell, tell Matt that Elizabeth was unhappy and loved Brian Speer, a real estate agent, and wanted a divorce. After Matt informs friends about Elizabeth's condition so they can say goodbye, he decides Brian should also have an opportunity to do the same. He and the girls, along with Alex's slacker friend Sid, travel to Kauai to find Brian. While there, Matt's cousin, Hugh, mentions that Brian is brother-in-law to Don Hollitzer, the developer to whom the majority of the family wants to sell the land. Brian stands to make a small fortune from the sales commission. Matt privately confronts Brian and informs him Elizabeth is dying, and offers him an opportunity to say goodbye. Brian says Elizabeth loved him, but he only loves his wife and children, then apologizes to Matt.

Frustrated and fragile from recent events, Matt asks Dr. Johnston to explain Elizabeth's inevitable death to Scottie. Elizabeth's father, Scott, admonishes Matt for failing to be a more generous and loving husband. Withholding his wife's affair, Matt agrees with him, but Sid and Alex unexpectedly defend Matt. At the King family meeting, Matt overrules the majority vote of his cousins, deciding instead to keep the land and look for a way around the rule against perpetuities. Shocked, Hugh tells Matt that the family will take legal action, but Matt is undeterred.

After learning about Brian's affair with Elizabeth, his wife, Julie, comes to the hospital. She tearfully tells a comatose Elizabeth that she wants to hate her for "trying to destroy" her family, but that she forgives her. Matt comes to terms with his wife's infidelity and impending death. He kisses her goodbye, followed by Alex and Scottie. They later scatter Elizabeth's ashes in the ocean off Waikiki.

Cast

Production

The film began its on-location shoot in Hawaii on March 15, 2010. Most of the film was shot in Honolulu and around Hanalei Bay. The location used as Matt King's house lacked the banyan tree described in the book; the filmmakers solved the issue by transplanting a banyan. For the scene where the King family drives up to a ridge to look over their land, the film used a  private cattle ranch on the south shore of Kauai, Kipu Ranch. Kaui Hart Hemmings, the author of the novel on which the movie was based, had a cameo as Matt King's secretary.

The private boarding school attended by Alex King was depicted as Mid-Pacific Institute, which is in Honolulu, Oahu. Kaui Hart Hemmings stated that Hawaii Preparatory Academy, which is located in Kamuela, Hawaii (the Big Island), was the inspiration for the private boarding school.

Postproduction began on June 14, and continued into February 2011. The film was screened at the Telluride, Toronto and New York film festivals and was originally scheduled to have a limited release on December 16, 2011, but was moved to November 23, 2011, and then November 18, 2011.

The soundtrack uses Hawaiian music, featuring artists including Gabby Pahinui, Ray Kane, Keola Beamer, Lena Machado, Sonny Chillingworth, Jeff Peterson, Makana, Dennis Kamakahi, and Danny Carvalho.

Reception

Box office
The Descendants opened in North America on November 16, 2011, in a limited release in 29 theaters, and grossed $1,190,096, averaging $41,038 per theater and ranking 10th at the box office. The film then had its wide release on December 9 in 876 theaters, and grossed $4,380,138, averaging $5,000 per theater and ranking seventh at the box office. The film was in cinemas for 156 days and its widest release in the United States was 2,038 theaters. The film ended up earning $82,584,160 domestically and $94,659,025 internationally for a total of $177,243,185.

Critical response
On Rotten Tomatoes, the film has an approval rating of 87% based on 268 reviews, with an average rating of 8.10/10. The website's critical consensus reads, "Funny, moving, and beautifully acted, The Descendants captures the unpredictable messiness of life with eloquence and uncommon grace." On Metacritic, the film has a weighted average score of 84 out of 100, based on 43 critics, indicating "universal acclaim". Audiences polled by CinemaScore gave the film an average grade of "A−" on an A+ to F scale.

Top ten lists
The Descendants has appeared on these critics' top-10 lists for the best films of 2011:

Accolades

References

External links

 
 
 
 
 
 The Descendants at The Numbers

2011 films
American drama films
2011 drama films
Best Drama Picture Golden Globe winners
Fox Searchlight Pictures films
Films directed by Alexander Payne
Films featuring a Best Drama Actor Golden Globe winning performance
Films set in Hawaii
Films shot in Hawaii
Films whose writer won the Best Adapted Screenplay Academy Award
Films set on beaches
Adultery in films
Films with screenplays by Alexander Payne
Films about father–daughter relationships
Films about sisters
2010s English-language films
2010s American films